Paula Andrea Ferrada Tolra (born April 28, 1977 in Cali, Colombia) is a Colombian born female surgeon and physician. She is a leader in trauma and acute care surgery. She is an internationally recognized advocate for equity, diversity and inclusion. Dr Ferrada currently serves as the system and division chief for Trauma and Acute Care Surgery Services at Inova Healthcare system.
She also serves as an educator with an associated appointment as a Professor of Medical Education at the University of Virginia.

Model and actress 

In 1994, Paula was awarded the title of Miss Belleza Juvenil a beauty pageant in Colombia, and became the hostess of a local TV show called Super Bien. After acting in numerous episodes in the Colombian comedy O todos en la cama, Paula began a modeling career, appearing in more than 50 television commercials.

Education and training 

Dr Ferrada finished medical school in Cali, Colombia, and arrived in the United States to pursue further training. After a year of research at the University of Miami, Ferrada joined Beth Israel Deaconess Medical Center, one of the major Harvard teaching hospitals for surgical residency. She was the first Colombian woman to graduate from a surgical specialty from Harvard.

Dr. Ferrada trained for one more year in Trauma and Critical care at the University of Pittsburgh, and then joined the R Adams Cowley Shock Trauma Center at the University of Maryland Medical Center as their first Acute Care Surgery Fellow. She joined Virginia Commonwealth University as faculty in the Division of Acute Care Surgical Services. She advanced to the rank of Professor of Surgery at this institution.

Dr Ferrada is now a well established surgeon-scientist, educator and leader

Mentor and educator 

While still a resident, Dr Ferrada became an American College of Surgeons Ultrasound Instructor and in 2007 she directed her first ultrasound course for residents.
As a result of her hard work in educating medical students and residents, she was recognized with multiple teaching awards from Harvard Medical School. As a surgeon she continued to work arduously in medical education. She was the recipient of the Irby-James Award for Excellence in Clinical Teaching and the Leonard Tow Humanism in Medicine Award during her tenure at the Virginia Commonwealth University VCU School of Medicine. She was also the recipient of the Leadership in Graduate Medical Education at this institution.

Dr. Ferrada directed multiple ultrasound courses for residents and trained multiple surgeons in the use of bedside ultrasound. She is well-versed in echocardiography and its use in fluid status management as a result of her training at the Trauma Echocardiography Service at Shock Trauma. She is the creator of a course designed to train first responders in the use of ultrasound to guide therapy in hypotensive patients. In collaboration with the Panamerican Trauma Society, Dr Ferrada taught this course in over 10 countries throughout Latin America.

Ferrada is a member of the Eastern Association for the Surgery of Trauma (EAST). Through this organization, Dr. Ferrada began dedicating her career toward mentoring young surgeons. During her tenure as the Chair of the mentoring committee she created a mid-career mentoring program. While serving as the Division Chair of Member Services for this organization, she developed a Twitter chat, a speaker's bureau, and several recruitment initiatives.

As a statement of Dr Ferrada’s commitment to education and mentoring she was inducted as a Member of The Academy of Master Surgeon Educators™ (MAMSE).

Leadership 

After joining the American College of Surgeons she dedicated her service to help other surgeons, using her leadership skills to open opportunities for others. She held multiple leadership roles in this organization, including President of the Virginia Chapter, Chair or the Young Fellows Association, served as a member of the program committee for the American College of Surgeons Clinical Congress, and she is currently the Vice Chair for verification and certification for the National Ultrasound Faculty. These leadership positions have allowed Dr Ferrada to empower women and unrepresented minorities and increase their involvement and participation in the activities of this organization.

She served as past president for the Virginia Chapter of the Association for Women Surgeons. During her tenure she worked to support and mentor medical students in all the medical school programs in the state.

She is very active in global surgery education through her membership in the Panamerican Trauma Society and with empowering women and young surgeons in Latin American countries. During her tenure as the Chair of the Education and Research committee she created a path for multi-institutional trials, founded a travel scholarship for young surgeons, founded an award for surgeon scientists and created a program to support Latin American surgeons in publishing their research. She served as the Executive Secretary for this organization, and is now President elect.

She has collaborated with social media effectively to create awareness about equality and diversity issues in surgery. Through Twitter, Facebook, blogs and other channels, Dr Ferrada has empower a diverse group of people to shatter stereotypes and show that surgeons do not need to conform to a specific image.

Dr Ferrada is an alumna of  The Hedwig van Ameringen Executive Leadership in Academic Medicine® program (ELAM®). This is a competitive program is dedicated to developing the professional and personal skills required to lead and manage in today's complex health care environment, with special attention to the unique challenges facing women in leadership positions.

Research 

In addition to her academic and clinical work, Dr. Ferrada has been awarded multiple grants providing support for her research in trauma resuscitation, including but not limited to, surgeon-performed ultrasound. In addition, Dr. Ferrada has over 120 publications in peer-reviewed journals.

She currently serves as an Associate Editor for the American Journal of Surgery. She serves on the editorial boards for the Journal of the American College of Surgeons, the Journal Surgery, and the Journal of Trauma and Acute Care Surgery.

References 

Colombian female models
Living people
Colombian surgeons
1977 births
American surgeons
Women surgeons
Trauma surgery
Surgery